Primary fallopian tube cancer (PFTC), often just tubal cancer, is a malignant neoplasm that originates from the fallopian tube.

Signs and symptoms
The internal location of the fallopian tubes makes it difficult to reach an early diagnosis. Symptoms are nonspecific, and may consist of pain and vaginal discharge or  bleeding. A pelvic mass may be detected on a routine gynecologic examination.

Vaginal discharge in fallopian tube carcinoma results from intermittent hydrosalphinx, also known as hydrops tubae profluens.

Pathology
The most common cancer type within this disease is adenocarcinoma; in the largest series of 3,051 cases as reported by Stewart et al. 88% of cases fell into this category. According to their study, half of the cases were poorly differentiated, 89% unilateral, and the distribution showed a third each with local disease only, with regional disease only, and with distant extensions. Rarer forms of tubal neoplasm include leiomyosarcoma, and transitional cell carcinoma.

As the tumor is often enmeshed with the adjacent ovary, it may be the pathologist and not the surgeon who determines that the lesion is indeed tubal in origin.

Secondary tubal cancer usually originates from cancer of the ovaries, the endometrium, the GI tract, the peritoneum, and the breast.

Diagnosis
A pelvic examination may detect an adnexal mass. A CA-125 blood test is a nonspecific test that tends to be elevated in patients with tubal cancer. More specific tests are a gynecologic ultrasound examination, a CT scan, or an MRI of the pelvis.
Occasionally, an early fallopian tube cancer may be detected by chance during pelvic surgery.

Staging
International Federation of Gynecology and Obstetrics (FIGO) staging is done at the time of surgery:
Stage 0: Carcinoma in situ
Stage I: Growth limited to fallopian tubes
Stage II: Growth involving one or both fallopian tubes with extension to pelvis
Stage III: Tumor involving one or both fallopian tubes with spread outside pelvis
Stage IV: Growth involving one or more fallopian tubes with distant metastases

Treatment
The initial approach to tubal cancer is generally surgical, and similar to that of ovarian cancer. As the lesion will spread first to the adjacent uterus and ovary, a total abdominal hysterectomy is an essential part of this approach, removing the ovaries, the tubes, and the uterus with the cervix. Also, peritoneal washings are taken, the omentum is removed, and pelvic and paraaortic lymph nodes are sampled. Staging at the time of surgery and pathological findings will determine further steps. In advanced cases when the cancer has spread to other organs and cannot be completely removed, cytoreductive surgery is used to lessen the tumor burden for subsequent treatments. Surgical treatments are typically followed by adjuvant, usually platinum-based, chemotherapy.
Radiation therapy has been applied with some success to patients with tubal cancer for palliative or curative indications

Prognosis
Prognosis depends to a large degree on the stage of the condition. In 1991 it was reported that about half of the patients with advanced stage disease survived 5 years with a surgical approach followed by cisplatinum-based chemotherapy.

Frequency
Tubal cancer is thought to be a relatively rare primary cancer among women, accounting for 1 to 2 percent of all gynecologic cancers, In the US, tubal cancer had an incidence of 0.41 per 100,000 women from 1998 to 2003.  Demographic distribution is similar to that of ovarian cancer, and the highest incidence is found in white, non-Hispanic women aged 60–79. However, recent evidence suggests tubal cancer to be much more frequent .

Evidence is accumulating that individuals with mutations of BRCA1 and BRCA2 are at higher risk for the development of PFTC.

References

External links 

Gynaecological cancer
Rare cancers